"Money to Burn" is the twentieth episode of the 1969 ITC British television series Randall and Hopkirk (Deceased) starring Mike Pratt, Kenneth Cope and Annette Andre. The episode was first broadcast on 30 January 1970 on the ITV. It was directed by Ray Austin.

Synopsis
Randall is offered by a dodgy Irish friend to take part in a money salvaging operation whereby £500,000 of old money is to be burnt, but is replaced with newspaper pieces. Neither informing the police nor accepting any part in the crime, Randall watches from a nearby street and is caught by the police and held in custody. His lady friend lawyer tracks down his dodgy friend at his London club finding the real culprits are his lady dancers, who attempt to fly to France in escape. However, leaving it to the ghost Marty, who is able to manipulate their navigational equipment and get them to return to an airfield in Surrey, they are captured, freeing Randall. Back at the police station Marty informs Jeff that Elizabeth is driving O’Malley home, to which Jeff realising what she is like, tells Marty what she is about to do. The episode ends showing Elizabeth’s car in a field, where inside Elizabeth and O’Malley are kissing, about to have sex.

Overview
In this episode Jeff's morality is questioned as he considers accepting the money to be incinerated.

Cast
Mike Pratt as Jeff Randall
Kenneth Cope as Marty Hopkirk
Annette Andre as Jeannie Hopkirk
Ivor Dean ...  Inspector Large
Roger Avon ...  Uniformed Policeman
Norman Beaton ...  Policeman
Tom Bowman ...  Security Man
Linda Cole ...  Anne-Marie Benson
Roy Desmond ...  Kevin O'Malley
John Glyn-Jones...  Chemist
John Hughes ...  Bank Worker
Richard Kerley ...  Sgt. Hinds
Sue Lloyd ...  Elizabeth Saxon
Olga Lowe...  Angela Kendon
Don Vernon ...  Choreographer

External links
http://www.randallandhopkirk.com

Randall and Hopkirk (Deceased) episodes
1970 British television episodes